Turin Cathedral is a Roman Catholic cathedral in Turin, northern Italy. Dedicated to Saint John the Baptist. It is the seat of the Archbishops of Turin.

It was built during 1491–1498, adjacent to a bell tower which had been built in 1470. Designed by Guarino Guarini, the Chapel of the Holy Shroud (the current location of the Shroud of Turin) was added to the structure in 1668–1694.

History

Lombard church
The church lies where the theatre of the ancient Roman city was located. Later, the site was developed with the construction of a complex of original three Christian churches, dedicated to the Holy Saviour, Saint Mary of Dompno and (the largest one) to St. John the Baptist. According to some sources, the consecration of the main church was carried on by Agilulf, the Lombard King of northern Italy from 591 to 613. In 662, Garibald, Duke of Turin (it) was assassinated in the church by a follower of Godepert, whose murder Garibald is believed to have had a part in.

The first three churches were demolished between 1490 and 1492. The construction of the new cathedral, still dedicated to St. John the Baptist, began in 1491. Amedeo de Francisco di Settignano, also known as Meo del Caprino, designed it and completed the construction in seven years. The pre-existing bell tower, was preserved. Filippo Juvarra modified the tower in the 17th century. Pope Leo X officially confirmed the church as metropolitan see in 1515.

In 1649 Bernardino Quadri prepared a project to enlarge the cathedral, to create a more impressive seat for the Holy Shroud. Quadri had moved from Rome  to join the court of Duke Charles Emmanuel II of Savoy in Turin.  His design was based on an earlier project by Carlo di Castellamonte: it included building an oval chapel behind the choir. In 1667 Guarino Guarini was invited to complete the project. The construction of the dome took 28 years: it was completed in 1694 under the direction of Marie Jeanne of Savoy, Charles Emmanuel II's widow.

The cathedral is the burial place of Blessed Pier Giorgio Frassati (1901–1925), Turin native, avid athlete, and benefactor of the poor, called the "saint for youth of the Third Millennium." He was beatified by John Paul II in 1990.

While the chapel of the Holy Shroud behind the cathedral was undergoing renovation during 2009, the Shroud was kept in a small chapel within the cathedral.

Notable people
Maestro di cappelli
Simon Boyleau
Alessandro Besozzi
Quirino Gasparini
Felice Alessandri
Feliciano Strepponi

Organists
Ruggier Trofeo

Funerals and burials

Giovanni "Gianni" Agnelli, member of the Agnelli family that owns Fiat
Andrea Pininfarina
Luciana Frassati Gawronska
Blessed Pier Giorgio Frassati
As Turin was the capital city of the Kingdom of Savoy, the cathedral is one of two in which members of the Royal Family (including the cadet branches) are buried in, the other being the Basilica of Superga in the outskirts of the city. Several royal consorts and princesses are buried here.

Gallery

References

Religious buildings and structures completed in 1498
15th-century Roman Catholic church buildings in Italy
Roman Catholic churches in Turin
Burials at Turin Cathedral
Shroud of Turin
Roman Catholic cathedrals in Italy
Cathedrals in Piedmont